The Nearctic realm is one of the eight biogeographic realms constituting the Earth's land surface.

The Nearctic realm covers most of North America, including Greenland, Central Florida, and the highlands of Mexico. The parts of North America that are not in the Nearctic realm include most of coastal Mexico, southern Mexico, southern Florida, coastal central Florida, Central America, and the Caribbean islands. Together with South America, these regions are part of the Neotropical realm.

Major ecological regions
The World Wildlife Fund (WWF) divides the Nearctic into four bioregions, defined as "geographic clusters of ecoregions that may span several habitat types, but have strong biogeographic affinities, particularly at taxonomic levels higher than the species level (genus, family)."

Canadian Shield
The Canadian Shield bioregion extends across the northern portion of the continent, from the Aleutian Islands to Newfoundland. It includes the Nearctic's arctic tundra and boreal forest ecoregions.

In terms of floristic provinces, it is represented by part of the Canadian Province of the Circumboreal Region.

Eastern North America

The Eastern North America bioregion includes the temperate broadleaf and mixed forests of the Eastern United States and southeastern Canada, the Great Plains temperate grasslands of the central United States and south-central Canada, the temperate coniferous forests of the southeastern United States, including central Florida. In terms of floristic provinces, it is represented by the North American Atlantic Region and part of the Canadian Province of the Circumboreal Region.

Western North America
The Western North America bioregion includes the temperate coniferous forests of the coastal and mountain regions of southern Alaska, western Canada, and the western United States from the Pacific Coast and Northern California to the Rocky Mountains (known as the Cascadian bioregion), as well as the cold-winter intermountain deserts and xeric shrublands and temperate grasslands and shrublands of the Western United States.

In terms of floristic provinces, it is represented by the Rocky Mountain region.

Northern Mexico and Southwestern North America
The Northern Mexico and Southwestern North America bioregion includes the mild-winter to cold-winter deserts and xeric shrublands, warm temperate and subtropical pine and pine-oak forests, and Mediterranean climate ecoregions of the Mexican Plateau, Baja California peninsula, and the southwestern United States, bordered to the south by the Neotropical Trans-Mexican Volcanic Belt. This region also includes the only subtropical dry broadleaf forest in the Nearctic realm, the Sonoran–Sinaloan transition subtropical dry forest.

In terms of floristic provinces, it is represented by the Madrean Region.

History
Although North America and South America are presently joined by the Isthmus of Panama, these continents were separated for about 180 million years, and evolved very different plant and animal lineages. When the ancient supercontinent of Pangaea split into two about 180 million years ago, North America remained joined to Eurasia as part of the supercontinent of Laurasia, while South America was part of the supercontinent of Gondwana. North America later split from Eurasia. North America has been joined by land bridges to both Asia and South America since then, which allowed an exchange of plant and animal species between the continents, the Great American Interchange.

A former land bridge across the Bering Strait between Asia and North America allowed many plants and animals to move between these continents, and the Nearctic realm shares many plants and animals with the Palearctic. The two realms are sometimes included in a single Holarctic realm.

Many large animals, or megafauna, including horses, camels, tapirs, mammoths, mastodons, ground sloths, sabre-tooth cats (Smilodon), short-faced bears and the American cheetah, became extinct in North America at the end of the Pleistocene epoch (ice ages) in what is called the Quaternary extinction event.

Flora and fauna

Flora and fauna that originated in the Nearctic
Mammals originally unique to the Nearctic include:
 Order Primates – the first primate/proto-primate, Purgatorius, originated in the Early Paleocene of the Nearctic.
 Family Canidae – dogs, wolves, foxes, and coyotes.
 Family Camelidae – camels and their South American relatives including the llama. Now extinct in the Nearctic
 Family Equidae – horses, donkeys and their relatives. Now only found in the Nearctic as feral horses.
 Family Tapiridae – tapirs now extinct in the Nearctic.
 Family Antilocapridae – last survivor of which is the pronghorn.
 Subfamily Tremarctinae (short-faced bears) – including the giant short-faced bear (Arctodus simus). The only surviving member of the group is the spectacled bear (Tremarctos ornatus) of South America.

Flora and fauna endemic to the Nearctic
One bird family, the wrentits (Timaliinae), is endemic to the Nearctic region. The Holarctic has four endemic families: divers (Gaviidae), grouse (Tetraoninae), auks (Alcidae), and the waxwings (Bombycillidae). The scarab beetle families Pleocomidae and Diphyllostomatidae (Coleoptera) are also endemic to the Nearctic. The fly species Cynomya cadaverina is also found in high numbers in this area.

Plants families endemic or nearly endemic to the Nearctic include the  Crossosomataceae, Simmondsiaceae, and Limnanthaceae.

Nearctic terrestrial ecoregions

See also
 List of ecoregions in Canada (WWF)
 List of ecoregions in Mexico (WWF)
 List of ecoregions in the United States (WWF)

References 

 Abell, R.A. et al. (2000). Freshwater Ecoregions of North America: A Conservation Assessment Washington, DC: Island Press, Freshwater Ecoregions of North America: A Conservation Assessment.
 Flannery, Tim (2001). The Eternal Frontier: an Ecological History of North America and its Peoples. Grove Press, New York.
 Ricketts, Taylor H., Eric Dinerstein, David M. Olson, Colby J. Loucks, et al. (1999). Terrestrial Ecoregions of North America: a Conservation Assessment. Island Press, Washington DC., Terrestrial Ecoregions of North America: A Conservation Assessment.

External links

 
 Map of the ecozones
 Nearctica, The Natural World of North America
 

 
Biogeographic realms